Cain Seedorf (born 19 January 2000) is a Dutch professional footballer who plays as a right back for Telstar.

Club career
On 19 May 2020, Seedorf signed his first professional contract with ADO Den Haag. He made his debut with ADO Den Haag in a 4–1 Eredivisie loss to FC Utrecht on 4 April 2021.

Personal life
Seedorf is a member of the Seedorf family with roots in Suriname. He is the nephew of the footballers Clarence, Jürgen, and Chedric Seedorf. He is also the cousin of the footballers Stefano, Collin, and Regilio Seedorf.

References

External links
 

2000 births
People from Oldenzaal
Footballers from Overijssel
Dutch sportspeople of Surinamese descent
Living people
Seedorf family
Dutch footballers
Association football wingers
ADO Den Haag players
SC Telstar players
Eredivisie players
Eerste Divisie players